Year 191 (CXCI) was a common year starting on Friday (link will display the full calendar) of the Julian calendar. At the time, it was known as the Year of the Consulship of Apronianus and Bradua (or, less frequently, year 944 Ab urbe condita). The denomination 191 for this year has been used since the early medieval period, when the Anno Domini calendar era became the prevalent method in Europe for naming years.

Events 
 By place 
 Parthia 
 King Vologases IV of Parthia dies after a 44-year reign, and is succeeded by his son Vologases V.

 China 
 A coalition of Chinese warlords from the east of Hangu Pass launches a punitive campaign against the warlord Dong Zhuo, who seized control of the central government in 189, and held the figurehead Emperor Xian hostage. After suffering some defeats against the coalition forces, Dong Zhuo forcefully relocates the imperial capital from Luoyang to Chang'an. Before leaving, Dong Zhuo orders his troops to loot the tombs of the Han emperors, and then destroy Luoyang by fire, to leave behind nothing for the coalition.
 Battle of Jieqiao: Yuan Shao narrowly defeats Gongsun Zan, in northern China.

 By topic 
 Art 
 c. 191–192 – The sculpture of Commodus as Hercules'', from Esquiline Hill, Rome, is made (it is now kept at Palazzo dei Conservatori, Rome).

 Religion 
 Serapion becomes Patriarch of Antioch.

Births 
 Xin Xianying, Chinese noblewoman and advisor (d. 269)

Deaths 
 Bruttia Crispina, Roman empress (executed) (b. 164)
 Han Fu, Chinese governor and warlord 
 Hua Xiong, Chinese general (executed)
 Qiao Mao, Chinese official and warlord
 Sun Jian, Chinese general and warlord (b. 155)
 Vologases IV, king of the Parthian Empire
 Zhang Wen, Chinese official and general

References